Cohors [prima] Cananefatium [quingenaria peditata] civium Romanorum ("[1st infantry 500 strong] cohort of Roman citizens Cyprii") was a Roman auxiliary infantry regiment. The cohort stationed in Dacia at castra of Bumbești-Jiu (Gară) and Vârtop).

See also 
 List of Roman auxiliary regiments

References
 Academia Română: Istoria Românilor, Vol. 2, Daco-romani, romanici, alogeni, 2nd. Ed., București, 2010, 
 Cristian M. Vlădescu: Fortificațiile romane din Dacia Inferior, Craiova, 1986

Military of ancient Rome
Auxiliary peditata units of ancient Rome
Roman Dacia